The Harmonicon was an influential monthly journal of music published in London from 1823 to 1833. It was edited at one period by William Ayrton (1777–1858.) Issues contained articles on diverse topics, including reviews of musical compositions, reviews of concert and opera performances, news of contemporary musicians and composers, features on music theory and the physics of sound, and biographical sketches of important musical figures.

References

The Harmonicon archive at HathiTrust

1823 establishments in the United Kingdom
1833 disestablishments in the United Kingdom
Monthly magazines published in the United Kingdom
Music magazines published in the United Kingdom
Defunct magazines published in the United Kingdom
Magazines established in 1823
Magazines disestablished in 1833
Magazines published in London